The Police Officer Michael J. Califano Memorial Bridge is a highway overpass in East Hills and Old Westbury in the Town of North Hempstead in Nassau County, on Long Island, in New York, United States. It carries Glen Cove Road (Nassau County Route 1) over the Long Island Expressway (Interstate 495). It is named in honor of Michael J. Califano, a police officer who was killed nearby in the line of duty.

Description 
The bridge was built in 2000, replacing an older span. It is of a steel stringer design.

In 2011, the bridge was named the Police Officer Michael J. Califano Memorial Bridge in honor of Officer Michael Califano, who was killed on the line of duty nearby when a truck crashed into his vehicle. The bill which proposed naming the bridge was drafted by New York State Senator Charles J. Fuschillo Jr. and New York State Assemblywoman Michelle Schimel, and it was co-sponsored by Senators Kemp Hannon, Carl L. Marcellino, Jack M. Martins, and Dean G. Skelos. It was signed and ultimately approved by Governor Andrew M. Cuomo.

The bridge is located at 40°46'59.9"N 73°37'23.0"W, on the border between the villages of East Hills and Old Westbury.

The bridge's New York State bridge identification number is 1049090.

See also 

 Police Officer Joseph P. Olivieri Jr. Memorial Bridge – Another bridge spanning the Long Island Expressway within Nassau County.

References 

Town of North Hempstead, New York
Bridges in Nassau County, New York
Bridges completed in 2000